G. vulgaris may refer to:
 Gaidropsarus vulgaris, the three-bearded rockling, a fish species found in European waters
 Golfingia vulgaris, the peanut worm, a marine invertebrate species

Synonyms
 Globularia vulgaris, a synonym for Globularia trichosantha, an ornamental plant species

See also
 Vulgaris (disambiguation)